Akhtubinsky District is an administrative and municipal district (raion), one of the eleven in Astrakhan Oblast, Russia. It is located in the north of the oblast. Its administrative center is the town of Akhtubinsk Population (excluding the administrative center):  31,963 (2002 Census);

References

Notes

Sources

Districts of Astrakhan Oblast